The West Moreton colonial by-election, 1862 was a by-election held on 15 December 1862 in the electoral district of West Moreton for the Queensland Legislative Assembly.

History
On 3 November 1862, Joseph Fleming, the member for West Moreton, resigned. Joshua Peter Bell won the resulting by-election on 15 December 1862.

See also
 Members of the Queensland Legislative Assembly, 1860–1863

References

1862 elections in Australia
Queensland state by-elections
1860s in Queensland